The Volkswagen GTI models may refer to:
 Volkswagen Gol GTI, a performance-oriented B-segment/supermini/subcompact hatchback produced between 1989 and 1994
 Volkswagen Golf/Rabbit GTI, a performance-oriented C-segment/small family car/compact hatchback produced since 1976
 Volkswagen Lupo GTI, a performance-oriented A-segment/city car produced between 2000 and 2005
 Volkswagen Polo GTI, a performance-oriented B-segment/supermini/subcompact hatchback produced since 1995
 Volkswagen Scirocco GTI, a performance-oriented 2+2 coupé produced between 1976 and 1981
 Volkswagen Up GTI, a performance-oriented A-segment/city car produced since 2017
 Volkswagen GTI Roadster Vision Gran Turismo, a concept car developed in 2014

Hot hatches